The Punnai Nallur Mariamman Temple, temple of goddess Mariamman, is a Hindu temple located at Punnainallur near Thanjavur in the state of Tamil Nadu, India.

Palace Devasthanam
Thanjavur Palace Devasthanam comprises 88 temples, of which this temple is the one. They are maintained and administered by the Hindu Religious and Charitable Endowments Department of the Government of Tamil Nadu.

Location
This temple located in Punnai Nallur, which is popularly known as Mariamman Kovil, Thanjavur and it is 5 km from Thanjavur Old Bus stand.

Kumbhabhishekham
During the reign of Tulaja of Thanjavur (1727 CE - 1735 CE) a small structure of the temple was built. Serfoji II (1798 CE - 1832 CE) built mahamandapa, narthana mandapa, gopura, the second inner prakara and conducted the Kumbhabhishekham. Later Kumbhabhishekhams were held on 1950 CE and 6 June 1987.

Gallery

References 

Mariamman temples
Hindu temples in Thanjavur district